Natalia Yanchak is a Canadian musician who plays keyboards and sings in The Dears. She is also a blogger and speculative fiction and science fiction writer.

References

An Interview with The Dears, Natalia Yanchak

External links
 

Year of birth missing (living people)
Living people
Anglophone Quebec people
Canadian women singers
Canadian science fiction writers
Canadian indie rock musicians
Musicians from Montreal
Writers from Montreal